The Cat & Fiddle is British Pub and restaurant located in Hollywood, California.

The pub was originally opened in Laurel Canyon by British musician Kim Gardner in 1982. The establishment then moved to Sunset Boulevard in 1985, where it remained for nearly 30 years. In 2014, the location was closed due to local development. Two years later, in 2017, The Cat & Fiddle reopened in its current location at 742 North Highland Avenue.

Celebrities such as Keith Moon, Rod Stewart, Robert Plant, Christopher Lloyd, Drew Barrymore and Morrissey have been regulars over the years.

References

1982 establishments in California
Drinking establishments in California
European restaurants in Los Angeles
Hollywood, Los Angeles
Restaurants established in 1982